Sweet Water Organics, Inc. was an urban farm located in the Bay View neighborhood of Milwaukee, Wisconsin. Founded in 2008 by Milwaukee entrepreneurs  Josh Fraundorf and James Godsil, Sweet Water's stated mission was to provide fresh, safe food for the community by employing methods of aquaponics and hydroponics that produce a variety of consumables while minimizing its impact on the local environment.

History
Sweet Water Organics incorporated in 2008 and broke ground on its facility in 2009. Former business partners Josh Fraundort and James Godsil founded the organization in the hopes of creating an urban, sustainable fish and vegetable farm. The first fish were added to the aquaponics system in July 2009, including 2,400 yellow perch and 33,000 tilapia. By mid-2010 Sweet Water was selling about 150 pounds of produce a week and had sold 3,000 perch. This model of production ran into problems however, and an award-winning 2012 investigative story in the Bay View Compass by Michael Timm exposed serious financial and management problems. Sweet Water ceased production the following year and was unable to pay back its loans to the city.

Urban Farm
Sweet Water's reclamation and revitalization projects were inspired by former basketball player and MacArthur Foundation Genius Grant-winner Will Allen. The farm was situated in a formerly abandoned 6.5 acre building complex and utilized four 11,000 gallon raceways dug directly into the concrete floor to house the fish. Expansions to the facility were to be paid for in part by a $250,000 loan from the City of Milwaukee that would have been entirely forgiven if it had created 45 jobs by the end of 2014. When Sweet Water folded, it was unable to pay back its loans.

Products
Products offered for sale to local residents, grocery stores, and restaurants included:
 tilapia
 perch
 lettuce
 sprouts
 wheatgrass
 watercress
 basil
 Swiss chard

Foundation
Sweet Water Organics operated a 501(c)(3) organization called The Sweet Water Foundation. The Foundation provides opportunities for community members to learn about sustainable agriculture, urban renewal, environmental conservation, and economic development.

References

Companies based in Milwaukee
Farms in Wisconsin